Gneven is a municipality in the Ludwigslust-Parchim district, in Mecklenburg-Vorpommern, Germany. It consists of the Ortsteile Gneven and Vorbeck.

References

Ludwigslust-Parchim